Events from the year 1941 in Canada.

Incumbents

Crown 
 Monarch – George VI

Federal government 
 Governor General – Alexander Cambridge, 1st Earl of Athlone
 Prime Minister – William Lyon Mackenzie King
 Chief Justice – Lyman Poore Duff (British Columbia)
 Parliament – 19th

Provincial governments

Lieutenant governors 
Lieutenant Governor of Alberta – John C. Bowen   
Lieutenant Governor of British Columbia – Eric Hamber (until August 29) then William Culham Woodward 
Lieutenant Governor of Manitoba – Roland Fairbairn McWilliams  
Lieutenant Governor of New Brunswick – William George Clark  
Lieutenant Governor of Nova Scotia – Frederick Francis Mathers  
Lieutenant Governor of Ontario – Albert Edward Matthews 
Lieutenant Governor of Prince Edward Island – Bradford William LePage 
Lieutenant Governor of Quebec – Eugène Fiset 
Lieutenant Governor of Saskatchewan – Archibald Peter McNab

Premiers 
Premier of Alberta – William Aberhart    
Premier of British Columbia – Duff Pattullo (until December 9) then John Hart  
Premier of Manitoba – John Bracken 
Premier of New Brunswick – John McNair 
Premier of Nova Scotia – A.S. MacMillan
Premier of Ontario – Mitchell Hepburn 
Premier of Prince Edward Island – Thane Campbell  
Premier of Quebec – Adélard Godbout 
Premier of Saskatchewan – William John Patterson

Territorial governments

Commissioners 
 Controller of Yukon – George A. Jeckell 
 Commissioner of Northwest Territories – Charles Camsell

Events
 January 1: The CBC News Service officially begins operations in English; operations in French begin the following day. CBC's board of governors determined that a national news service would assist in reporting the war.
 March 4: The Royal Canadian Mounted Police begin to register Japanese Canadians; registration is completed by the end of August.
 April 29: Quebec, the last province to exclude women from the legal profession, allow women to practise law.  The first Quebec woman lawyer is Elizabeth Monk, who is called to the bar the next year.
 July 24: Workers began an illegal strike at the Alcan aluminum complex at Arvida, Quebec, when 700 workers walk off the job. Some 4,500 workers occupy the factory the next day. Minister of Munitions and Supply C.D. Howe says that enemy sabotage was responsible for the work stoppage, and soldiers are sent to secure the facility.  Work resumes on July 29 as workers and management negotiate, assisted by federal conciliators. A subsequent royal commission rejects the sabotage theory and finds that the strike was the result of worker dissatisfaction with wages and working conditions, as well as a heat wave that occurred immediately before the strike. 
 August 9–12: The Atlantic Conference meeting between Winston Churchill, Franklin D. Roosevelt and Harry Hopkins, as well as their civilian and military advisers, is held secretly aboard the USS Augusta docked in Ship Harbour, Placentia Bay, Argentia in the Dominion of Newfoundland. The leaders discuss Lend-Lease and the war in Europe. The conference was the first of nine wartime meetings between FDR and Churchill. On August 14, the leaders publicly issue the Atlantic Charter, a joint declaration of Anglo-American aims, including freedom of the seas, self-determination, free government, and liberal trade.
 August 12: All Japanese Canadians are ordered to carry identity cards with their thumbprint and photo.
 August 13: An order-in-council (PC 6289) establishes the Canadian Women's Army Corps. The Women's Royal Canadian Naval Service is established the following year.
 September 19:  torpedoes and sinks , killing 18 sailors.
 December 7:  collides with a merchant ship and sinks in the North Atlantic, killing 23 sailors.
 December 7 (North America time)/December 8 (Hong Kong time):  Battle of Hong Kong: On the same morning as the attack on the U.S. naval base at Pearl Harbor, the Japanese attack British Hong Kong, with relentless air raids for the next  days. Hong Kong surrenders on December 25. The Japanese attack is a disaster for the Canadians, who were greatly outnumbered by the Japanese. Of the 1,975 Canadians who went to Hong Kong, more than 1,050 were killed or wounded, and many are taken prisoner by Japan.
 December 8: Immediately following the Japanese attack on Hong Kong, Canada declares war on Japan, on the same day that Britain and the United States do so. 
 December 8: The day after Japanese attacks on Hong King and Pearl Harbor, all fishing boats owned by Japanese Canadians are impounded by the Royal Canadian Navy.
 December 9: John Hart becomes Premier of British Columbia, replacing Thomas "Duff" Pattullo, after a Liberal convention dumps Pattullo as leader and replaces him with Hart. Following the October 21 provincial election in which the Liberals fell to 21 seats while the CCF won 14 and the Conservatives 12, Pattullo's government had faltered. Hart forms a coalition between the Liberals and the Conservatives.

Undated
 The Victoria Park Plant (later renamed the R. C. Harris Water Treatment Plant), a massive Art Deco water facility, opens in Toronto.

Sports 
April 30 – The Manitoba Junior Hockey League's Winnipeg Rangers win their first Memorial Cup by defeating the Quebec Junior Hockey League's Montreal Royals 3 games to 2. The deciding game was played at the Montreal Forum.
November 29 – The Winnipeg Blue Bombers win their third Grey Cup by defeating the Ottawa Rough Riders 18 to 16 in the 29th Grey Cup played at Varsity Stadium in Toronto.

Births

January to June
 January 9 - Gilles Vaillancourt, politician
 January 12 - Long John Baldry, singer and voice actor (d. 2005)
 January 20 - Pierre Lalonde, singer and television host (d. 2016)
 January 21 - Gary Beck, two-time World champion drag racing driver
 January 26 - Doug Rogers, judoka and Olympic silver medallist

 February 18 - David Kilgour, politician
 February 20 - Buffy Sainte-Marie, musician, composer, visual artist, pacifist, educator and social activist
 March 7 - Roger Carl Young, politician and lawyer
 May 16 - Eric Berntson, politician (d. 2018)
 May 17 - Andy Boychuk, long-distance runner
 May 29 - Gilbert Barrette, politician
 June 17 - Roberta Maxwell, actress
 June 21 - Lyman Ward, actor

 June 25 - Denys Arcand, film director, screenwriter and producer

July to December
 July 1 
 Rod Gilbert, professional ice hockey forward (d. 2021) 
 Myron Scholes, economist
 July 7 - Vivian Barbot, Canadian-Haitian teacher, activist, and politician
 July 14 - Dennis Kassian, ice hockey player
 July 22 - Ron Turcotte, jockey
 July 28 - Peter Cullen, voice actor
 July 30 - Paul Anka, singer, songwriter and actor
 August 5 - Lenny Breau, guitarist (d. 1984)
 August 6 - Hedy Fry, politician and physician
 August 12 - Réjean Ducharme, novelist and playwright
 September 1 - Gwendolyn MacEwen, novelist and poet (d. 1987)
 September 5 - Dave Dryden, ice hockey player (d. 2022)
 October 5 - Bonnie Korzeniowski, politician
 October 13 - Robert Hunter, environmentalist, journalist, author and politician (d.2005)
 November 9 - Tom Siddon, politician
 December 22 - James Laxer, political economist, professor and author

Deaths

January to June
 February 20 - La Bolduc, singer and musician (b.1894)
 February 21 - Frederick Banting, medical scientist, doctor and Nobel laureate (b.1891)
 April 22 - Ernest Lloyd Janney,  Provisional Commander of the Canadian Aviation Corps (b.1893)
 June 10 - Henry Wise Wood, politician and president of the United Farmers of Alberta (b.1860)
 June 11 - Alexander Cameron Rutherford, lawyer and politician, first premier of Alberta (b.1857)
 June 16 - Edward Rogers Wood, financier (b.1866)

July to December

 August 12 - Freeman Freeman-Thomas, 1st Marquess of Willingdon, 13th Governor General of Canada (b.1866)
 August 24 – Margaret McKellar, Scottish-born Canadian medical missionary (b.1861)
 September 29 - Sir William Hearst, politician and 7th Premier of Ontario (b.1864)
 October 17 - John Stanley Plaskett, astronomer (b.1865)
 November 18 - Émile Nelligan, poet (b.1879)
 November 22 - Newton Rowell, lawyer and politician (b.1867)
 November 26 - Ernest Lapointe, politician (b.1876)
 December 20 - John Campbell Elliott, lawyer and politician (b.1872)

Full date unknown
 William Robson, politician (b.1864)

See also
 List of Canadian films

Historical documents
Outline guide to Canadian Army, including organization, training, arms and services, medical services, auxiliary services and "Need for Men"

PM King: "The war has grown in intensity and extent. Threats have become realities[...]and fears have been turned into terrors."

"The American Republics [are] in serious danger" - President Roosevelt calls for defence of Western Hemisphere

"War is approaching" - Roosevelt warns American republics of Nazi intentions of subversion and enslavement in hemisphere

PM King agrees it's important to convince Latin America that Nazis are as menacing to South America as to North

Roosevelt and Churchill agree to Atlantic Charter's principles of postwar peace at shipboard conference in Newfoundland

Franklin Roosevelt's account of covert voyage to his meeting with Winston Churchill in Newfoundland

Advocating nuclear weapons, MAUD Committee compares power of 25 lbs. of uranium material to millions of pounds that exploded in 1917 Halifax

By attacking U.S. and British Empire forces, Japanese "make their own ruin inevitable"

"A tremendous financial burden" - PM King details Canada's direct and indirect contributions (money, materiel and people) to war effort

Canada enhances Northwest Staging Route for transit of U.S. warplanes and supplies through Yukon to besieged U.S.S.R.

Thank-you letter to Vuntut Gwitchin for money contributed to orphans and homeless children in Britain

Communist Party of Canada challenges RCMP commissioner's remarks regarding "reds"

Interned Soviet sympathizers demand release from Canadian "concentration camp" after Germany attacks U.S.S.R.

High school girls join Ontario Farm Service Force to pick fruit on Niagara Peninsula as their war service

High school girls in YWCA's Hi-Y clubs raise funds selling War Savings stamps at movie theatres

"Give him my love" - with "very real warmth," Mackenzie King asks Washington official to pass message to Franklin Roosevelt

"What a shock" - House of Commons reacts to news of Frederick Banting's death in airplane crash

Prime Minister King offers to find government job for defeated MP Agnes Macphail

Film reveals Winston Churchill's comic timing in his Some Chicken - Some Neck! speech to Parliament

Humorous letter about searching for Kawartha Lakes, Ontario soldiers for writer to host in England

Teenager experiences gay scene in movie theatres of downtown Toronto

Film: air route from Edmonton to Alaska

Memories of 60 years' work at Great Lakes grain elevator about to be torn down

"A friend completely trusted" - obituary for Prime Minister King's dog Pat

References

 
Years of the 20th century in Canada
Canada
1941 in North America